The State Sports Centre (known commercially as the Quaycentre) is a multi-use indoor arena in Sydney, New South Wales, Australia and was opened in November 1984. With a total of 3,854 fixed and retractable seats the main arena is a focal point of the Sydney Olympic Park Sports Centre. An additional 1,152 portable seats can be accommodated on the floor level to bring seated capacity to 5,006.

History

Basketball and netball
In 1986, Centre became home to Sydney's then two National Basketball League (NBL) teams, the Sydney Supersonics and West Sydney Westars. When they merged before the 1988 NBL season to form the Sydney Kings, the new team remained at the centre and would stay for two years before moving to the 12,000 seat Sydney Entertainment Centre (SEC) in 1990.

The Centre then hosted local basketball until the formation of a new NBL team in 1998 called the West Sydney Razorbacks (later renamed the Sydney Spirit). The new club called the Centre home from 1998 until the club folded in 2009.

The Sydney Sandpipers netball team called the venue home from 1997–2003 until they folded, and since 2008 it has been the home venue for the New South Wales Swifts netball team. Between 2017 and 2019, it was home to the Suncorp Super Netball team Giants Netball.

Due to a schedule conflict at the SEC, the Sydney Kings returned to the State Sports Centre for a game against defending NBL champions the New Zealand Breakers in Round 10 of the 2012–13 NBL season. The Kings defeated the Breakers 75–62 in front of 4,178 fans.

Futsal
The centre hosted finals games in the Australian futsal league, with crowds higher than would have been appropriate for the usual Sydney venue of the Fairfield Leisure Centre.

2000 Olympic Games
The State Sports Centre was one of the venues of the 2000 Summer Olympics, held in Sydney. It hosted the table tennis and taekwondo events.

Other
Hillsong's album For This Cause was recorded at the centre on 5 March 2000. C3 Church's album Send Down Your Love was also recorded at the centre during the Church's "Love Sydney" event held on 10 September 2009. In 1998, Shout to the Lord 2000 was recorded at this place as well during the 1998 Hillsong Conference.

See also

 2000 Summer Olympics venues
 List of sports venues in Australia

References

 2000 Summer Olympics official report. Volume 1. p. 382.

External links
 State Sports Centre
 

1984 establishments in Australia
Sports venues completed in 1984
Tourist attractions in Sydney
Sports venues in Sydney
Music venues in Sydney
Indoor arenas in Australia
Netball venues in New South Wales
Basketball venues in Australia
Defunct National Basketball League (Australia) venues
Badminton venues
Venues of the 2000 Summer Olympics
Olympic table tennis venues
Olympic taekwondo venues
Sydney Kings
West Sydney Razorbacks
New South Wales Swifts
Giants Netball
Sydney Swifts
Sydney Olympic Park